Uriah Miles  (4 Jan 1907–1970) was an English footballer who played as a winger for Wrexham and Rochdale. He also played non-league football for various other clubs.

References

Wrexham A.F.C. players
Rochdale A.F.C. players
Witton Albion F.C. players
Bacup Borough F.C. players
Great Harwood F.C. players
Sportspeople from Newcastle-under-Lyme
English footballers
1907 births
1970 deaths
Association footballers not categorized by position